Brad Gross (born 29 October 1990) is a Grand Prix motorcycle racer from Australia.

Career statistics

By season

Races by year

References

External links
 Profile on motogp.com

Australian motorcycle racers
Living people
1990 births
125cc World Championship riders